Patravadi Mejudhon (born 1948) is a Thai actress, playwright, television director/producer and teacher of dramatic arts. She is known for her acting career, television productions, as well as the stage production company and school based at her Patravadi Theatre. She was named National Artist in performing arts in 2015.

References

Patravadi Mejudhon
Patravadi Mejudhon
Patravadi Mejudhon
1948 births
Living people